is a postgraduate university in Japan, established in 1990.

JAIST was established in the centre of Ishikawa Science Park (ISP). It is to the south of Kanazawa City. JAIST has programs of advanced research and development in science and technology. This university has several satellite campuses: Shinagawa Campus in Shinagawa, Tokyo (relocated from its earlier Tamachi Campus in Minato, Tokyo), open course in Information Technology and Management of Technology (MOT), and satellite lectures in Kanazawa City and Toyama City.

In The 21st Century Center Of Excellence Program, JSPS granted two programs to  JAIST.

History 

 1989 A committee was organized at Tokyo Institute of Technology for foundation of a research-intensive university in Ishikawa Prefecture (Hokuriku region).
 1990 JAIST was founded in Japan as Japan's first postgraduate university without undergraduate faculty. Graduate School of Information Science was organized. The Institute Library was constructed. 
 1991 Graduate School of Materials Science was organized. The Center for Information Science was established. 
 1992 The Center for New Materials was established.
 1993 The Center for Research and Investigation of Advanced Science and Technology was established.
 1994 The Health Care Center was established. 
 1996 The Institute Library opens. Graduate School of Knowledge Science was organized.
 1998 The Center for Knowledge Science was established. 
 2001 The Research Center for Remote Learning was established. The Internet Research Center was established. 
 2002 The Center for Nano Materials and Technology was established, as the result of reorganization of the Center for New Materials. The Venture Business Laboratory was established.  
 2003 The IP (Intellectual Property) Operation Center was established. The Center for Strategic Development of Science and Technology was established. 
 2004 JAIST was incorporated as a National University Corporation. The Research Center for Trustworthy e-Society was established.
 2005 JAIST held the 15th anniversary ceremony.
 2007 The Research Center for Integrated Science was established. The Center for Highly Dependable Embedded System Technology was established.

Research departments 

 Graduate School of Information Science 
 Department of Information Science
 Graduate School of Materials Science 
 Department of Materials Science
 Graduate School of Knowledge Science 
 Department of Knowledge Science
9 Research Areas from April 2016.
Human life design area
Knowledge Management
Security and Networks 
Intelligence Robotics
Entertainment Technology
Energy and Environment
Materials Chemistry
Applied Physics
Bio-science and Biotechnology'''

All individual schools have MSc and Ph.D. programs. The MSc programs standard term is two to three years and the Ph.D. programs' standard term length is three years.

Rankings 
JAIST has been ranked highly amongst Japanese Universities, coming 26th in Japan in the Webometrics Ranking of World Universities (and 871st in the world). In UniRank's 2017 ranking of Japanese universities, JAIST came in 25th place and 130th in Asia.

Location 

 1-1 Asahidai, Nomi City, Ishikawa Prefecture, Japan 
 postal code: 923-1292
 For more details, please see here: https://www.jaist.ac.jp/english/top/access/index.html

External links

References 

Education in Chūbu region
Education in Ishikawa Prefecture
Universities and colleges in Ishikawa Prefecture
Japanese national universities
Engineering universities and colleges in Japan
Internet mirror services
Educational institutions established in 1990
1990 establishments in Japan
Nomi, Ishikawa